Tom Murphy (born April 19, 1962) is an American politician serving in the Minnesota House of Representatives since 2023. A member of the Republican Party of Minnesota, Murphy represents District 9B in western Minnesota, which includes the city of Perham and parts of Douglas and Otter Tail Counties.

Early life, education and career 
Murphy was raised on a dairy farm in Scott County, Minnesota along with his seven siblings. He attended college at St. Cloud State University, earning a bachelor's degree in marketing. Murphy runs an agriculture products business.

Minnesota House of Representatives 
Murphy was first elected to the Minnesota House of Representatives in 2022, after redistricting and the retirement of Republican incumbents Steve Green and Jordan Rasmusson, both of whom ran for seats in the Minnesota Senate. Murphy serves on the Health Finance and Policy and Transportation Finance and Policy Committees.

Electoral history

Personal life 
Murphy lives in Underwood, Minnesota with his wife, Betty, and five children. He is Catholic and attends St. James Catholic Church in Maine Township, Minnesota.

References

External links 

Members of the Minnesota House of Representatives

1962 births
Living people